Union Grove State Park is a  state park in Tama County, Iowa, United States, near the city of Gladbrook. The park, which was opened in 1938, is home to the  Union Grove Lake along with a dam and a waterfall.

The lake features two boat ramps, a beach, and 24-hour fishing sites. Fish living in the lake include bluegill, channel catfish, crappie, largemouth bass, and walleye. The park also includes  of hiking trails, a campground, and two cabins. Animals that can be seen within the park include deer, turkeys, and various songbirds.

References

State parks of Iowa
Protected areas of Tama County, Iowa